Knaak is a surname. Notable people with the surname include:

Delores J. Knaak (1929–2020), American educator and politician
Fritz Knaak (born 1953), American lawyer and politician
Peter Knaak (born 1942), Canadian politician 
Rainer Knaak (born 1953), German Chess Grandmaster
Richard A. Knaak (born 1961), American novelist
Turid Knaak (born 1991), German footballer 
Will Knaak (born 1984), American guitarist and singer-songwriter

Occupational surnames